Howard Charles Clark,  (born 4 September 1929) is a Canadian chemist and university administrator.

Born in Auckland, New Zealand, Clark was educated at Takapuna Grammar School and received a Bachelor of Science degree in 1951, a Master of Science degree in 1952, and a PhD in 1954 from the University of Auckland. He then received a second PhD in 1958 from University of Cambridge. From 1954 to 1955, he was a lecturer at the University of Auckland. From 1955 to 1957, he was a Fellow at the University of Cambridge. He emigrated to Canada in 1957 as an assistant professor at the University of British Columbia. He became a full professor and remained at UBC until 1965, when he was appointed Head of Chemistry at the University of Western Ontario. From 1976 to 1986, he was Vice President Academic and a professor of chemistry at the University of Guelph. From 1986 to 1995, he was the 9th President of Dalhousie University as well as a professor of chemistry.

From 1983 to 1984, he was President of the Chemical Institute of Canada.

He is the author of Growth and Governance of Canadian Universities: An Insider's View (2003).

References
 Canadian Who's Who 1997 entry

External links
 Howard Charles Clark at The Canadian Encyclopedia

1929 births
Living people
Alumni of the University of Cambridge
Canadian chemists
Canadian university and college chief executives
Canadian university and college vice-presidents
Academic staff of the Dalhousie University
Fellows of the Royal Society of Canada
New Zealand chemists
New Zealand emigrants to Canada
People educated at Takapuna Grammar School
People from Auckland
University of Auckland alumni
Academic staff of the University of British Columbia Faculty of Science
Academic staff of the University of Guelph
Academic staff of the University of Western Ontario